The 2018–19 Georgia Tech Yellow Jackets women's basketball team represented Georgia Institute of Technology during the 2018–19 NCAA Division I women's basketball season. Returning as head coach was MaChelle Joseph in her 16th season. The team played its home games at McCamish Pavilion in Atlanta, Georgia as members of the Atlantic Coast Conference. They finished the season 17–13, 7–9 in ACC play to finish in ninth place. They lost in the second round of the ACC women's tournament to North Carolina. Despite having 17 wins, they were not invited to a postseason tournament for the first time since 2013.

Less than a month after being placed on leave for a personnel matter, Georgia Tech fired Joseph on March 26 after 16 seasons. She finished her tenure with 311 wins, the most in program history. On April 9, Tech hired coaching veteran and ESPN analyst Nell Fortner, whose most recent coaching job had been an 8-season stint at Auburn.

Previous season
They finished the 2017–18 season 20–14, 6–10 in ACC play to finish in tenth place. They advanced to the second round of the ACC women's tournament where they lost to Virginia. They were invited to the Women's National Invitation Tournament where they advanced to the third round where they lost to Alabama.

Off-season

Recruiting Class

Source:

Roster

Schedule

|-
!colspan=9 style=""| Exhibition

|-
!colspan=9 style=""| Non-conference regular season

|-
!colspan=9 style=""| ACC regular season

|-
!colspan=9 style=""| ACC Women's Tournament

Source

Rankings

See also
2018-19 Georgia Tech Yellow Jackets men's basketball team

References

Georgia Tech Yellow Jackets women's basketball seasons
Georgia Tech